Slavne (also Slavnoe), is a rural settlement in Shakhtarsk Raion in Donetsk Oblast (province) of eastern Ukraine.

External links

 Slavne 

Rural settlements in Donetsk Oblast